István Visy (1 August 1906 – 6 March 2000) was a Hungarian equestrian. He competed in two events at the 1936 Summer Olympics.

References

External links
 

1906 births
2000 deaths
Hungarian male equestrians
Olympic equestrians of Hungary
Equestrians at the 1936 Summer Olympics
People from Dombóvár
Sportspeople from Tolna County